Play6 is a Belgian commercial television channel for Flemish public which started broadcasting on 6 October 2016. It is part of Play Media. The channel is a sister channel of Play4 and Play5. ZES focuses on older, successful series, movies and sitcoms. Most of them are of American origin. Furthermore, the channel is the first Flemish one to focus on the broadcast of series with all episodes of one or more seasons directly after each other.

History 
On 14 June 2016, SBS Belgium announced to launch a third channel named ZES. Main reason is that their other channels, VIER and VIJF, will more focus on Flemish productions. As there is still a market which wanted to see foreign, mainly English-languaged movies, sitcoms and series, it was decided to move the broadcast of these programs previously broadcast in the two other channels to this new channel. ZES launched on 6 October 2016.

On 28 January 2021, the channel was rebranded as Play6 as part of the rebranding under the "Play" name.

References

Television channels in Flanders
Television channels in Belgium
ProSiebenSat.1 Media
Zaventem
2016 establishments in Belgium
Television channels and stations established in 2016